Liam Sternberg (born July 28, 1949) is an American songwriter and producer who wrote the Bangles hit "Walk Like an Egyptian".

Career 
Sternberg began his musical career as part of the late-1970s "Akron Sound" which included Devo and the Waitresses. A member of the band Jane Aire and the Belvederes, Sternberg curated an Akron Sound compilation album for Stiff Records, which gained the attention of rock critic Robert Christgau and brought national attention to the scene. Following this, he worked for other artists including Kirsty MacColl, Rachel Sweet, Ratt, Fuzzbox, Riff Regan, and Baby Tuckoo. As a songwriter, Sternberg was the composer of the theme for the hit television program 21 Jump Street. In 1980, Sternberg also produced the first single from the post-punk band Theatre of Hate, featuring vocalist Kirk Brandon.

Personal life 
Sternberg has lived in Paris since 1990.

References

1949 births
Living people
American male songwriters
Record producers from Ohio
Songwriters from Ohio